La Fausse Maîtresse (often titled Paz in English translation) is an 1843 novel by French novelist and playwright Honoré de Balzac (1799-1850) and included in his series of novels (or Roman-fleuve) known as La Comédie humaine (The Human Comedy) which parodies and depicts French society in the period of the Restoration and the July Monarchy (1815-1848). The plot is subtle and complex, and the true explanation is carefully hidden until the end of the book.

Plot summary 

Clementine is a descendant of rich and noble families whose wealth has been dissipated. She married Count Laginski a Polish immigrant who is quite prosperous. They are a happy couple well set up in an attractive house.  Clementine discovers that Adam has a friend who is acting as steward and general manager, a handsome young man who has kept in the background.  Adam and Thaddee had served together in the army and were close friends, although Thaddee was poor, but very capable. He was devoted to Adam, and had volunteered to look after Adam’s affairs since he was worried that Adam and his wife would dissipate their fortune. Clementine insists that Thaddee join in their various social activities and finds him attractive. Thaddee falls in love with Clementine, but his devotion to his friends puts him in complete anguish. When Clementine tries to find out more about him, he invents a secret mistress who is a girl in the circus called Malaga. Having done this, he has to make the story true, and tracks down Malaga and sets her up as if he were his mistress. However he does no more apart from paying for her keep, but upsets Clementine by carrying on with her and occasionally having to borrow money. In time, Thaddee believes Clementine is capable of looking after the finances, and claims that to get Malaga out of his mind he is leaving Paris and going into the army again. Nothing more is heard of him, until one night, when an infamous rake tries to seduce Clementine, taking her away in his carriage. A figure grabs Clementine and sets her on the right track in her own carriage. It is Paz, who has never left Paris but has kept in the background looking after his friends. It is revealed that the invention of Malaga as his imaginary mistress was a ploy to discourage Clementine from taking an interest in him, thereby preserving his friendship with Adam.  It is not quite clear whether Adam had had an affair with Malaga which Paz had to keep quiet.

Characters 
 Count Adam Laginski
 Clementine
 Thaddee Paz
 Malaga (Marguerite Turquet)

Footnotes

External links 

 La Fausse Maîtresse at Project Gutenberg.
 The Human Comedy by Honoré de Balzac hosted by Carnegie Mellon University.
 La Fausse Maîtresse, audio version .

Books of La Comédie humaine
1843 French novels
Novels by Honoré de Balzac